My Life with the Walter Boys is an upcoming American television series that is set to release on Netflix. The coming-of-age drama is an adaptation of Ali Novak's 2014 novel of the same name, which was first published on Wattpad. The series will follow recently-orphaned Jackie Howard (Nikki Rodriguez), a teenage girl from Manhattan who relocates to rural Colorado after she is taken in by the Walters, a family of ten sons. The Netflix series is created by Melanie Halsall, and is co-written by Halsall and Ali Novak. The show is slated to star Marc Blucas, Alisha Newton, and Sarah Rafferty.

Filming for the series began in March 2022, in Alberta, Canada, and was expected to conclude by September 2022.

Cast and characters

Main 

 Nikki Rodriguez as Jackie Howard
 Ashby Gentry as Alex Walter
 Noah LaLonde as Cole Walter
 Sarah Rafferty as Dr. Katherine Walter
 Marc Blucas as George Walter
 Corey Fogelmanis as Nathan Walter
 Jaylan Evans as Skylar Summerhill
 Connor Stanhope as Danny Walter
 Zoë Soul as Haley Young
 Johnny Link as Will Walter

Recurring 

 Alisha Newton as Erin
 Ashley Holliday as Tara
 Moheb Jindran as Nikhil
 Mya Lowe as Kiley
 Gabrielle Jacinto as Olivia
 Ellie O'Brien as Grace
 Dean Petriw as Jordan Walter
 Lennix James as Benny Walter
 Alix West Lefler as Parker Walter

Production 
Sony Pictures Television and iGeneration Studios are producing My Life with the Walter Boys, following iGeneration Studios' acquisition of Komixx Entertainment. Ed Glauser, who was the executive producer for Netflix's The Kissing Booth film series, joined production alongside showrunner and executive producer Melanie Halsall. Production for the series took place across Alberta, with filming locations in the city of Calgary, the town of Cochrane, and the town of Crossfield.

References 

American teen drama television series
Upcoming drama television series
Upcoming Netflix original programming
English-language Netflix original programming
Television series about teenagers
Television shows based on American novels
Television series by Sony Pictures Television
Television shows filmed in Calgary
Television shows set in Colorado